Christoph Froschauer (ca. 1490 – 1 April 1564) was the first printer in Zurich, notably for printing the Froschauer Bible, the Zwinglian Bible translation. His workshop is the nucleus of the Orell Füssli publishing house.

Froschauer was born in Neuburg near Oettingen (Bavaria) and acquired Zürich citizenship on 9 November 1519, as a gift "for his art." He learned the printer's trade with his uncle, Hans Froschauer, in Augsburg and came to Zurich in 1515. Working for one Hans Rüegger, he built a printing press. At Rüegger's death in 1517, Froschauer married his widow and took over the press, and he was given citizenship in 1519. A dispute over the sausage eating organized by Froschauer in his workshop during Lent in 1522 brought about open conflict between Zwingli and the clerical establishment, thus setting off the Reformation in Zürich.

At his wife's death in 1550, he married Dorothea Locher.

The  Froschau quarter of Zürich, just off the current Froschaugasse, is named for Froschauer. The historical workshop was at the northern boundary of the Froschau, at Brunngass 18, facing the Zähringerplatz.
 
He printed the works of  Erasmus von Rotterdam,  Luther and notably of Zwingli. Between 1520 and 1564, about 700 titles in close to a million copies left Froschauer's four presses. The paper used was produced in the city's paper mill at the Limmat, also operated by Froschauer.
Froschauer died of the plague in 1564 in Zurich. His nephew Christoph Froschauer the Younger (1532–1585) took over the shop.

A frog in the Stumpffia genus was named after him in 2020.

See also
History of Zürich

References

External links
Froschauer, Christoph (d. 1564) at Global Anabaptist Mennonite Encyclopedia Online

1564 deaths
16th-century printers
16th-century Swiss people
Swiss book publishers (people)
Year of birth unknown
People from Zürich
16th-century businesspeople